On May 12, 2007, the city of San Antonio, Texas, held an election to choose who would serve as Mayor of San Antonio for a 2-year term to expire in 2009. Incumbent mayor Phil Hardberger won over 77 percent of the vote, securing re-election to a second and final 2-year term. (Term limits were relaxed from two 2-year terms to four 2-year terms starting with the 2009 election; however, such relief does not apply to those who have already been elected to an office in which the two-term limit applies.)

Background
Phil Hardberger, who was first elected mayor in the 2005 mayoral election, decided to pursue election to a second and final term. His opponent in the runoff, Julian Castro opted not to seek a rematch against Hardberger in the 2007 mayoral election, thus leaving Hardberger to face six minor candidates in the election (Castro would instead seek, and successfully gain election to the mayoralty of San Antonio two years later).

Declared
 R. G. Griffing 
 Phil Hardberger, incumbent Mayor of San Antonio
 Michael "Commander" Idrogo 
 Patrick McCurdy 
 Julie Iris Oldham 
 Eiginio Rodriguez 
 Rhett R. Smith

Declined
 Julian Castro, former District 7 councilman and 2005 mayoral candidate

Results 
On May 12, 2007, the election for Mayor was held. Phil Hardberger secured re-election with over 77% of the vote, thus negating the need of a runoff election (which would have been required if no candidate got 50%+1 of all votes cast).

 
 
 
 
 
 
 
 
 
* Vote percentage include all of Bexar County with a total of 17,493 (2.06%) either voting in another municipal election, casting a spoiled vote or casting no ballot for San Antonio mayor.

References

21st century in San Antonio
2007 Texas elections
2007 United States mayoral elections
2007
Non-partisan elections